is a Japanese beach soccer player. With the Japan national beach soccer team, he won the silver medal at the 2021 FIFA Beach Soccer World Cup held in Russia.

References

1989 births
Living people
Japanese footballers
Japanese beach soccer players